Ardeshir Darabshaw Shroff (4 June 1899 – 27 October 1965) was an industrialist, banker and economist of India. In 1944, Shroff served as a non-official (since India was not yet independent) delegate at the United Nations "Bretton Woods Conference" on post-war monetary and financial systems. In the same year, and with seven other leading industrialists, Shroff co-authored the Bombay Plan, which was a set of proposals for the development of the post-independence Indian economy.

In the 1950s, Shroff was founder-director of the Investment Corporation of India and company chairman of Bank of India and the New India Assurance Company Limited. In 1954, Shroff co-founded the Forum of Free Enterprise think tank as a means to counter the socialist tendencies of the Nehru government. He complained against the indifference with which the state treated entrepreneurs, and asserted that if the Government of India were to shed some of their 'impractical ideologies' and extend their active support to the private sector, very rapid industrialisation could be brought about within the next 10 years. Shroff also served as company director of the Tata Group and of several other leading private industries. A biography of Shroff, commissioned by the Forum of Free Enterprise, was published in 2000 by business journalist Sucheta Dalal.

References

20th-century Indian economists
Parsi people
Indian bankers
1899 births
1965 deaths